Sam Melville Gibbons (January 20, 1920 – October 10, 2012) was an American politician from the state of Florida, who served in the Florida State House of Representatives, Florida State Senate, and the U.S. House of Representatives. He represented the city of Tampa in Congress for over 30 years.

Early life and education
Gibbons was born in Tampa, Florida on January 20, 1920. He went to Roosevelt Elementary School when he was a young child. The current-day auditorium is named after him. He graduated from H. B. Plant High School, where he was part of JROTC, and then went on to the University of Florida. After military service during World War II, Gibbons attended the University of Florida School of Law, graduating in 1947. He then joined four generations of his family practicing law in Tampa. He went on to marry Martha Hanley, and have three sons; Clifford Sam, Mark Hanley, and Timothy Melville. After 55 years of marriage, his wife died of cancer in 2002; Gibbons then married a recently widowed friend, Betty King Culbreath.

Military career
After the outbreak of World War II, Gibbons joined the United States Army as a Second Lieutenant in late 1941. He attained the rank of Captain in the 101st Airborne before entering combat in June 1944. At 1:00 a.m. on D-day, June 6, 1944, Captain Gibbons, 501st Parachute Infantry Regiment, 101st Airborne Division, arrived by parachute near Carentan, France, on the Cotentin Peninsula.  On June 13, 1944, the main German forces counterattacked south of Carentan, in a battle between German tanks and the American paratroopers lasting all day, 6 am to 10 pm, the paratroopers gave ground, defending in depth, and bent but did not break before restoring the pre-dawn line of defense. Of the 600 paratroopers that began that day fewer than 400 soldiers remained.  Gibbons could count a dozen burning tanks from his view of the battlefield. The battle was portrayed in episode 2 of Band of Brothers. On June 30 the 101st was withdrawn to England becoming the first battle-tested troops to return. He was later awarded the Bronze Star for his actions in Normandy.

Gibbons and the rest of the 101st went on to successfully take the first bridge in Operation Market Garden (described in Cornelius Ryan's book A Bridge Too Far).  In December 1944 the 101st was in reserve when orders came down to load up on trucks and move to Bastogne to hold and await resupply. Against very long odds the 101st held successfully with dwindling supplies, once famously telling the German commander "Nuts" in response to a surrender request. Several movies have been made concerning the "Battle of the Bulge." The 101st moved on to lead the way into Germany and eventually take Hitler's Eagle's Nest before meeting up with the advancing Red Army.  Gibbons served in the European campaign until the end of the war. Shortly before German forces surrendered, Capt. Gibbons was promoted to Major; however, a communications delay prevented Gibbons from learning of his promotion until after he had been honorably discharged.  Upon returning home to Florida he authored a memoir of his wartime service, I Was There.  Gibbons was awarded the French Medal of Valor in 2004 at the Normandy American Cemetery and Memorial during the 60th anniversary of D-day.

Political life
Gibbons was a member of the Democratic Party and he served in the Florida House of Representatives from 1953 to 1958. While in the state legislature, he spearheaded the effort to create the University of South Florida. He then served in the Florida Senate from 1959 to 1962.

He was elected to the United States House of Representatives in 1962 from a newly created district based in Tampa after defeating segregationist Sumter de Leon Lowry Jr. in the Democratic primary and runoff elections, and was reelected 16 times. Gibbons voted against the Civil Rights Act of 1964, but in favor of the Voting Rights Act of 1965 and the Civil Rights Act of 1968. The district changed numbers three times during his tenure, from the 10th (1963–1967) to the 6th (1967–1973) to the 7th (1973–1993) to the 11th (1993–1997).  He usually skated to reelection in what was generally reckoned as the only Democratic bastion on Florida's Gulf Coast.  However, in 1992, he was held to only 52 percent of the vote by Republican Mark Sharpe.  Two years later, he defeated Sharpe again, only winning by 4,700 votes.

With Sharpe priming for yet another rematch in 1996, Gibbons opted not to run for an 18th term.  He thus retired having never been defeated in 44 years as an elected official.  He was succeeded by State Representative Jim Davis, whom he'd endorsed as his successor.

Gibbons was acting chairman of the House Ways and Means Committee from 1994 until the Democrats lost control of the House in 1995.  Prior to leading the full committee, Gibbons chaired the subcommittee on trade. He was much more supportive of trade liberalization throughout his career than most House Democrats, who have leaned toward protectionism since the early 1970s.

Gibbons had a few verbal showdowns with the newly elected Republican congress during his last term. During a taped Ways and Means Committee hearing, after being denied the opportunity to speak several times, Gibbons stormed out of the room shouting about how the Democrats were being railroaded and given no time to speak. He compared the new Republicans to dictators and shouted that he had "to fight you guys 50 years ago," referring to Nazi Germany in World War II.

He retired from office in 1997. The United States Courthouse at 801 North Florida Avenue in Tampa was named in his honor.

Death
Gibbons died October 10, 2012, aged 92. He was interred at Myrtle Hill Memorial Park in Tampa.

References

External links

Biographical Directory of the US Congress
Gibbons & Company
USF Oracle: "Creating a local alternative for learning"
The University of South Florida Tampa Library Special & Digital Collections maintains the Papers of Congressman Sam Gibbons
 

1920 births
2012 deaths
United States Army personnel of World War II
Democratic Party Florida state senators
Henry B. Plant High School alumni
Democratic Party members of the Florida House of Representatives
Politicians from Tampa, Florida
United States Army officers
Democratic Party members of the United States House of Representatives from Florida
University of Florida alumni
20th-century American politicians
Fredric G. Levin College of Law alumni
Members of Congress who became lobbyists